Adnan Malik is a Pakistani film and television actor, director, and producer under his own company's banner, AMP. He is also WWF Pakistan's goodwill ambassador and an Asia Society, Asia 21 Fellow and Young Leader of the World. Malik has also served on the board for the Citizen's Archive of Pakistan.

As an actor, he made his television debut with the hit series Sadqay Tumhare for Hum TV. Portraying the writer of the drama, Khalil-ur-Rehman Qamar, in an autobiographical piece, Malik earned three nominations at 3rd Hum Awards, winning two including Best Television Sensation Male and Best Onscreen Couple opposite Mahira Khan. He received his first Best TV Actor nomination at 15th Lux Style Awards. He followed up the series by playing a wanderlust photographer, Sikander in romantic drama series Dil Banjaara for Hum Network, alongside Sanam Saeed and Mira Sethi.

In 2018, he made his film debut with Cake, which was directed by Asim Abbasi. He played the character called Romeo in the film.

As a director, his documentary Bijli earned him the Best Short Film award at Kara Film Festival in 2003. He directed The Forgotten Song or Bhuli Hui Hoon Daastan, the first feature-length documentary on Pakistani cinema, that played at festivals around the world, is an integral part of film syllabi across the country and was also instrumental in allowing Indian films to be re-screened in Pakistan after a 42-year ban. He also directed the promotional music video for Jawani Phir Nahi Ani and has directed television commercials for brands like Coca-Cola, Nescafé, Cornetto, Fanta, and Oye Hoye! among others.

Early life and education
His ancestral roots lie in the Shamsabad village, near Attock.

His father is a cardiologist and his mother Parveen Malik is an early childhood educator and part-time TV actress.

His brother Saqib Malik is a director.

Career

Documentaries
After studying film-making in US, he started working on directing documentaries, such as Why We Fight which cited as one of a "best American Documentary" at Sundance Film Festival 2005. Adnan came back to Pakistan in 2005 but before coming made a short subject documentary Bijli  which won Best Short Film at Kara Film Festival, Delhi Digital Film Festival and was finalist at United States Student Academy Awards 2003. His second documentary, Bhuli Hui Hoon Dastaan (The Forgotten Song), was commissioned by Geo TV and played at festivals around the world. After Mushtaq Gazdar's book on Pakistani Cinema, this documentary was the only other major research piece on the subject.

TV commercials and music videos
Malik has modelled with clothing brands and was a VJ at MTV. He serves as an associate video producer and behind the scene producer at Coke Studio for four years. Malik then directed and produced TV commercials for Pepsi, Djuice, Telenor, Wall's, Cornetto, Nescafe, LUX etc. He also directed a music video for Levi's Mera Bichra Yaar in collaboration with Strings and Zoe Viccaji which earned him a Best Music Video Director at 11th Lux Style Awards. In 2012 he directed/produced a video My Punjabi Love For You for Bumbu Sauce, featuring Aamina Sheikh and Rizwan Ali Jaffri. In addition he has also directed Lux Style Awards ceremonies for four years. In 2016, he directed critically acclaimed short-film Love is in the Air for Cornetto under advertising agency Ogilvy & Mather Pakistan, Adnan said, "I never expected such a response but I did believe it would have an empowering impact on some people. Multiply this by ten and you get a feature film, that's the goal...one day!."

Acting

Malik marked his professional-acting debut in 2007 with Zibahkhana: Hell's Ground and followed that with an appearance in Slackistan in 2008. Later he appeared in 2014 Hum TV's drama serial Sadqay Tumhare written by Khalil-ur-Rehman based on his own life-story and directed by Mohammed Ehteshamuddin, portraying Khalil opposite to Mahira Khan, as her love interest. He describes his experience in the serial as "personal growth". and he received three Hum Award nominations winning two including Hum Award for Best Television Sensation Male, Hum Award for Best Onscreen Couple and was nominated for Hum Award for Best Actor Popular. Malik received his first Best TV Actor nomination at 15th Lux Style Awards. Before the serial he played a supporting role in controversial film Slackistan. In 2016, he was cast in a role of Sikandar an aspiring photographer in romantic drama series Dil Banjaara, opposite Sanam Saeed and Mira Sethi. In an interview with Dawn News, Malik describes, "I play the role of Sikander, who's an aspiring photographer, a part of him that resonates with me because that's what peaked my interest in the arts, when my father bought me my first camera. He's a very rugged, outdoorsy kinda guy, very different from Khalil. There's just this lightness to him. So the show revolves around this guy who's a bit of a wanderer and his equation with two ladies, a non-traditional love triangle of sorts."

Production house
Malik owns a boutique media production house called Adnan Malik Production (AMP), where he directs and produces TV commercials, documentaries, music videos and photography.

Non-film work
While in New York City he owned a tee-shirt company named Urban Turban, his products being popular enough to attract the attention of famed fashion designer and stylist Patricia Field.

Filmography

Documentaries

 Bijli 
 Bhuli Hui Hoon Dastaan
 Social Circus
 Telephone Payar

Music videos and short films

 Mera Bichra Yaar – 
 Phir Milli Tanhai
 My Punjabi Love for You
 Phir Se Game Utha Dain
 Love is in the Air

Film

Television

Webseries

Awards and nominations

See also 
 List of Lollywood actors

References

External links 

 

Living people
Pakistani male film actors
Pakistani male television actors
Pakistani Sunni Muslims
Hum Award winners
Best Television Sensation Male Hum Award winners
Best Onscreen Couple Hum Award winners
Pakistani radio personalities
Pakistani television directors
People from Lahore
Pakistani photographers
Pakistani filmmakers
Pakistani music video directors
Pakistani documentary filmmakers
Television commercial directors
People from Islamabad
Pakistani television producers
Vassar College people
Vassar College alumni
Lahore American School alumni
1984 births